is a private university in Gamagōri, Aichi, Japan. The school opened as a junior college in 1987. It became a four-year in 2000. It offers profound scholarship and sound technological skills to students based on their founding spirit of Freedom, Love and Justice as well as on their educational motto Creation and Humanity. As part of the endeavor, They offer language training programs in the US, New Zealand, and various other countries while promoting academic exchange programs with partner schools in China.
Aichi Prefecture has become a teeming hub of monozukuri, or Japanese craftsmanship, in recent years, and AIT is fulfilling its role as a comprehensive technical university in the region by enhancing the practical educational offerings that will develop human resources who can make their mark on the world stage

References

External links
 Official website 

Educational institutions established in 1987
Private universities and colleges in Japan
Universities and colleges in Aichi Prefecture
Engineering universities and colleges in Japan
1987 establishments in Japan
Gamagōri, Aichi